Garey is a census-designated place in Santa Barbara County, California located east of U.S. Route 101 about  southeast of Santa Maria and  north of Sisquoc. The ZIP Code is 93454, and the community is inside area code 805. The population was 68 at the 2010 census.

History
Garey was founded in 1889, named after horticulturalist Thomas Garey.

Geography
According to the United States Census Bureau, the CDP covers an area of 1.3 square miles (3.3 km), 99.70% of it land, and 0.30% of it water.

Demographics

At the 2010 census Garey had a population of 68. The racial makeup of Garey was 53 (77.9%) White, 0 (0.0%) African American, 1 (1.5%) Native American, 0 (0.0%) Asian, 0 (0.0%) Pacific Islander, 5 (7.4%) from other races, and 9 (13.2%) from two or more races. Hispanic or Latino of any race were 21 people (30.9%).

The whole population lived in households, no one lived in non-institutionalized group quarters and no one was institutionalized.

There were 28 households, 6 (21.4%) had children under the age of 18 living in them, 15 (53.6%) were opposite-sex married couples living together, 3 (10.7%) had a female householder with no husband present, 0 (0%) had a male householder with no wife present.  There were 0 (0%) unmarried opposite-sex partnerships, and 0 (0%) same-sex married couples or partnerships. 10 households (35.7%) were one person and 3 (10.7%) had someone living alone who was 65 or older. The average household size was 2.43.  There were 18 families (64.3% of households); the average family size was 3.17.

The age distribution was 13 people (19.1%) under the age of 18, 4 people (5.9%) aged 18 to 24, 17 people (25.0%) aged 25 to 44, 25 people (36.8%) aged 45 to 64, and 9 people (13.2%) who were 65 or older.  The median age was 45.0 years. For every 100 females, there were 112.5 males.  For every 100 females age 18 and over, there were 111.5 males.

There were 29 housing units at an average density of 22.9 per square mile, of the occupied units 20 (71.4%) were owner-occupied and 8 (28.6%) were rented. The homeowner vacancy rate was 0%; the rental vacancy rate was 0%.  42 people (61.8% of the population) lived in owner-occupied housing units and 26 people (38.2%) lived in rental housing units.

References

Census-designated places in Santa Barbara County, California
Census-designated places in California
Populated places established in 1809
1809 establishments in Alta California